Crosby station is a historic former train station in Crosby, Minnesota, United States.  It was established in 1910.  It was listed on the National Register of Historic Places in 1980 as the Crosby Railroad Depot for having local significance in the themes of commerce, industry, and transportation.  The depot was nominated for being an essential conduit for the arrival of goods and people and the export of iron ore during central Crow Wing County's economic boom years.

The building now serves as the Soo Line Depot Museum, operated by the Cuyuna Iron Range Heritage Network.

History
The Crosby Soo Line Depot initially served as a train station for the Minneapolis, St. Paul and Sault Ste. Marie Railway (later the Soo Line Railroad starting in 1961).  The station was part of a project conducted from 1908 to 1910 to build a rail line from Superior, Wisconsin, to Thief River Falls, Minnesota, along with a branch through Crosby to access the Cuyuna Range iron mines.

Museum
The Soo Line Depot Museum interprets historical events and daily life on the Cuyuna Range through displays of artifacts, documents, and photos.  Holdings include a display on the Milford Mine disaster, vintage wedding dresses, logging and mining tools, and a replica of the Project Manhigh capsule launched nearby in 1957.

See also
 List of museums in Minnesota
 National Register of Historic Places listings in Crow Wing County, Minnesota

References

1910 establishments in Minnesota
History museums in Minnesota
Museums in Crow Wing County, Minnesota
National Register of Historic Places in Crow Wing County, Minnesota
Former Soo Line stations
Railway stations on the National Register of Historic Places in Minnesota
Railway stations in the United States opened in 1910
Former railway stations in Minnesota